Frank Van Deren Coke, F. Van Deren Coke, or  Van Deren Coke (July 4, 1921 – July 11, 2004) was an American photographer, scholar and museum professional. He was born in Lexington, Kentucky, and died in Albuquerque, New Mexico.

Early career
Coke's introduction to photography began as a practicing photographer. He studied with Nicholas Haz at the Clarence H. White School of Photography and later with Ansel Adams.  He had his first exhibition at the University of Kentucky in 1940 while he was there studying history and art history.

Museum jobs
Coke was the founding director of the University of New Mexico Art Museum from 1962 to 1970. In 1970—during Beaumont Newhall's final year—he served as Deputy Director and from 1971 to 1972 as Director of the George Eastman Museum (then George Eastman House). From 1979 to 1987 he was director of the San Francisco Museum of Modern Art's photography department.

Notable publications

References

External links
 Luminous-Lint page
 Van Deren Coke in the George Eastman House Collection

1921 births
2004 deaths
Directors of museums in the United States
Directors of George Eastman House
Artists from Lexington, Kentucky
University of New Mexico faculty
Historians of photography
20th-century American photographers
American art historians
Writers from New Mexico
University of Kentucky alumni
Indiana University Bloomington alumni
Harvard University alumni